Deshi or Desi people are an indigenous Muslim community from Assam. Deshis are Muslim converts from Koch and Mech communities. In 2022, the government of Assam gave them recognition as an indigenous community.

Ali Mech is said to be the first person of the community.
The group is descended from a set of tribals which were collectively referred to as Koches, who converted to Islam as they were unable to find a favourable position in Hindu society and came to known as the 'Rajbongshi Muslims'. The group once known as Koch muslim They are homogeneous with the Koch Rajbongshi people and are bi-linguistic speaking both Assamese language and Kamatapuri language.

Most other conversions took place during the 16th-century, when the lower-class Koch and Mech people
unable to find a respectable position in the newly formed Koch kingdom (1515 - 1956) switched to Islam.

References 

Ethnic groups in Assam